Robert Hassan Ehsan (born May 3, 1982) is an American college basketball coach that is currently an assistant coach for the Stanford Cardinal. From 2016–2020, he was the head men's basketball coach at the University of Alabama at Birmingham (UAB).

A native of Sacramento, California, Ehsan was a four-year player at UC Davis. He was a team captain as a senior in 2005. Ehsan served as an assistant coach at the University of Maryland from 2008 to 2011. When Gary Williams resigned, Ehsan was named interim head coach. He spent a season as an assistant at Virginia Tech before becoming an assistant coach at UAB in 2012.

Ehsan was hired as UAB head coach on April 4, 2016, replacing Jerod Haase. Ehsan took over a team that went 26–7 the year before and lost one senior, Robert Brown. "We strongly believe Rob has the experience and background to build on the already strong foundation he helped establish and take Blazer Basketball to new levels of success," said UAB athletics director Mark Ingram.

Ehsan was fired on March 13, 2020, after compiling a record of 76–57.

On April 27th, 2021, Ehsan joined Haase at Stanford University as an assistant coach.

Personal life
Ehsan holds a bachelor's degree in economics from UC Davis and an MBA from Maryland. He is married to the former Lindsey Rattray. They have a daughter, Katelyn, and two sons, Davis and Robert Ryder.

Head coaching record

References

1982 births
Living people
American men's basketball players
Basketball coaches from California
Virginia Tech Hokies men's basketball coaches
Maryland Terrapins men's basketball coaches
College men's basketball head coaches in the United States
UAB Blazers men's basketball coaches
UC Davis Aggies men's basketball players
Basketball players from Sacramento, California